Bec-de-Mortagne is a commune  in the Seine-Maritime department in the Normandy region in northern France.

Geography

History
The name comes from ‘’Becr’’, a Norse word for stream, together with the name of the Mortagne family, seigneurs of the village.

Bec-de-Mortagne in the Pays de Caux is thought to be the birth-place of Turstin FitzRolf, standard bearer to William the Conqueror at the Battle of Hastings in 1066, as he was described by the 12th-century chronicler Orderic Vitalis as from "Bec-en-Caux".

Around 1175, Guillaume de Mortagne gave the parish church to the Archbishop of Rouen, ( Willelmi Becco of Moritania) who gave it to the chapter after his death, stipulating that the priest should have a third of the tithes and the canon two-thirds.

A knight, Henri de Soteville, sought possession of the church. He was excommunicated, but having later submitted, the excommunication was lifted.

In the 13th century, Bec-Moreteigne had 500 inhabitants and the parish priest was paid 15 pounds .

The year 1562 saw the formal civil status of Bec de Mortagne granted and in 1824 it was joined with the former parish of Baigneville to form the present commune.

Population

Places of interest
 The church of St.Martin, dating from the 11th century.
 Traces of a medieval castle.
 An 18th-century presbytery

See also
Communes of the Seine-Maritime department

References

Communes of Seine-Maritime